Egehan Arna (born January 5, 1997) is a Turkish professional basketball player for Anadolu Efes of the Basketbol Süper Ligi (BSL) and EuroLeague.

Early years
Arna began playing with the youth clubs of Fenerbahçe, at the age of 7.

Professional career
Arna began his pro career in 2015, with the senior men's club of Fenerbahçe.

On May 10, 2019, Arna scored 51 points and had 14 rebounds in a 138–62 away win over Sakarya BB. Arna shot 20-31 from the field, while shooting on 10-16 three point field goals. He set a season-high for points scored in the 2018–19 Basketbol Süper Ligi.

On July 7, 2020, Arna was released from the Turkish club. He signed a two-year deal with Beşiktaş on August 6.

On July 1, 2022, he has signed with Anadolu Efes of the Basketbol Süper Ligi (BSL).

Turkish national team
Arna played with the junior national teams of Turkey. With Turkey's junior national teams, he played at the 2013 FIBA Europe Under-16 Championship.

References

External links
 Egehan Arna at draftexpress.com
 Egehan Arna at eurobasket.com
 Egehan Arna at euroleague.net
 Egehan Arna at fiba.com (archive)
 Egehan Arna at fiba.com (game center)
 Egehan Arna at fibaeurope.com
 Egehan Arna at nbadraft.net
 Egehan Arna at tblstat.net
 Egehan Arna at twitter.com

1997 births
Living people
Anadolu Efes S.K. players
Beşiktaş men's basketball players
Fenerbahçe men's basketball players
Small forwards
Basketball players from Istanbul
Turkish men's basketball players